Murat Akça (born 13 July 1990) is a Turkish footballer who plays as a central defender for Pendikspor. He has been trained by the Galatasaray youth department.

References

External links
 
 
 
 

1990 births
Footballers from Stuttgart
German people of Turkish descent
Living people
German footballers
Turkish footballers
Turkey under-21 international footballers
Turkey youth international footballers
Association football central defenders
Galatasaray A2 footballers
Galatasaray S.K. footballers
Denizlispor footballers
Adana Demirspor footballers
Sivasspor footballers
Kardemir Karabükspor footballers
Yeni Malatyaspor footballers
Elazığspor footballers
Giresunspor footballers
Altay S.K. footballers
Pendikspor footballers
Süper Lig players
TFF First League players
TFF Second League players